

Valeri Brainin (aka Willi Brainin and Brainin-Passek,  (Valeri Borissovich Brainin)   ), Russian/German musicologist, music manager, composer, and poet.

Born January 27, 1948, in Nizhni Tagil, Russia, in the family of Austrian poet and translator, political émigré Boris Brainin (Sepp Österreicher), who belonged to the well-known Viennese Brainin family (his relatives are Hebrew publicist, biographer and public figure Reuben Brainin, Austrian/British violinist Norbert Brainin and others).

He lives at the moment both in Hanover, Germany, and in Moscow, Russia.

Positions
President (from 2004) of the Russian Federation Society for Music Education (RussSME) – National Affiliate of the International Society for Music Education (ISME), a member of UNESCO.
Head of the Laboratory of New Technologies in Music Education, Moscow State Pedagogical University.
Art Director of Classica Nova International Music Competition.

Art Director of the net of Brainin Music Schools (Brainin-Musikschulen), Germany.

He has directed seminars/master courses at conservatoires and universities in Austria, Colombia, Germany, Italy, Russia, USA, etc. In addition he offered weekly music talks on Radio Liberty from Munich and Prague, and has literary, critical and scientific musical publications in Russian, German, English, and Italian.

Music activities
Brainin is a full Member of the International Teacher's Training Academy of Science (Moscow), and of other scientific/pedagogical societies. He studied mathematics, linguistics, musical pedagogics, music theory and composition. He has had works performed in the Bolshoi Theatre, Moscow, and taught at Moscow's Gnessin Music School for specially gifted children. The Brainin Teaching Method for ‘development of musical intelligence in children’ became a standard part of the curriculum. He is also a noted piano teacher for children. Among his former students there are some prize-winners of national and international competitions.
 Brainin is a researcher in microtonal music.

Literary activities
Russian poet (also known as Valeri (Willi) Brainin-Passek), a pupil of Arseny Tarkovsky, a member (1985–1990) of Moscow Club „Poezia“ (:ru: Клуб «Поэзия») together with Yuri Arabov, Jewgenij Bunimovitch, Mikhail Epstein, Alexandr Eremenko, Sergey Gandlevsky, Nina Iskrenko, Timur Kibirov, Alexei Parshchikov, Dmitri Prigov, Lev Rubinstein, a. o.
Most essential poetry publications:
Russian:
literary magazines "Znamya" (Moscow), "Novy Mir" (Moscow), "Arion" (Moscow), "Ogoniok" (Moscow), "Grani" (Frankfurt-am-Main), "Dvadtsat dva" (Jerusalem), "Kreshchatik" (Kiev), anthologies "Verses of the Century" (Moscow, compiled by Yevgeny Yevtushenko) and "Verses of the Century-2" (Moscow, compiled by Eugen V. Witkowsky).
 Брайнин-Пассек, В. К нежной варварской речи. Стихотворения. Составитель Михаил Безродный. Предисловие Юрия Арабова. — СПб.: Алетейя, 2009. — 94 c. — (Серия «Русское зарубежье. Коллекция поэзии и прозы»). 
English:
literary magazine "Partisan Review" (Boston).

Well-known relatives
 Elisabeth Brainin (1949), Austrian psychoanalyst and scientific writer
 Fritz Brainin (1913–1992), Austrian/American poet
 Harald Brainin (1923–2006), Austrian poet and writer
 Max Brainin (1909–2002), Austrian/American commercial graphic artist and violinist
 Norbert Brainin (1923–2005), Austrian/British violinist, the founder of Amadeus Quartet
 Reuben Brainin (1862–1939), Hebrew publicist, biographer and public figure

References
 Sofia Gubaidulina. Preface to "A Musical Language Course" by Valeri Brainin

Sources

Russian male poets
Russian musicologists
Russian composers
Russian male composers
Russian music educators
German musicologists
Musicians from Moscow
Writers from Hanover
Soviet emigrants to Germany
20th-century Russian Jews
1948 births
Living people
20th-century Russian translators
20th-century Russian male writers